Roosevelt: The Soldier Of Freedom, 1940-1945 is a 1970 biography of US President Franklin D. Roosevelt by James MacGregor Burns, published by Harcourt Brace Jovanovich. The book won the 1971 Pulitzer Prize for History and the National Book Award for Nonfiction (History and Biography).  It is a sequel to Roosevelt: The Lion and the Fox (1956).

References 

1970 non-fiction books
Pulitzer Prize for History-winning works
History books about the United States
Harcourt (publisher) books
Biographies of Franklin D. Roosevelt